The Battle of Drumlui was a Scottish clan battle that took place in either 1330 or 1337, in the Scottish Highlands between the Clan Cameron and the Clan Mackintosh.

Background

The parents of William Mackintosh, 7th chief of Clan Mackintosh and the confederation of Clan Chattan, had removed from their lands in Lochaber which were subsequently occupied by the Clan Cameron without disturbance. However, when William became a man he demanded that the lands were restored to him, but this claim was denied to him and refused by the Camerons who claimed that the lands had been deserted and now belonged to themselves as they were the first to seize and occupy them.

Battle

The (Mackintosh of) Kinrara MS (manuscript) mentions a great battle at Drumlui in which William Mackintosh defeated the Camerons who were under the leadership of Donald Alin Vic Ian, or Donald Alin Mhic Evin. However, a number of Mackintosh and Clan Shaw men were also mortally wounded.

Aftermath

This battle led to a very long-lasting 350 year feud which did not end until near the end of the 17th century. In the immediate aftermath of the Battle of Drumlui each clan alternately harried each other's lands, lifting cattle, until the famous Battle of Invernahavon in 1370.

References

Notes

Conflicts in 1330
Conflicts in 1337
1337 in Scotland
14th-century Scottish clan battles